Time Out for Ginger is a Broadway comedy by Ronald Alexander that ran 248 performances at the Lyceum Theatre from November 26, 1952, to June 27, 1953, before becoming hugely popular in regional theatres throughout the 1950s and early 1960s.  Jack Benny starred in a one-hour October 6, 1955, Shower of Stars television broadcast, and the play was later adapted into the feature film, Billie, starring Patty Duke.

The Broadway production starred Melvyn Douglas as Howard Carol, a middle-class husband and father of three girls, one of whom, Ginger (Nancy Malone), wants to try out for her school's football team.  At first supportive of his daughter's goal, he begins to feel pressure from Ed Hoffman (Philip Loeb), the president of the bank where he works, and the community at large. The setting is the Carols' living room.

In 1954, several of the original cast members, including Melvyn Douglas, Nancy Malone and Philip Loeb, took the play to Chicago, where Steve McQueen replaced Broadway's Conrad Janis as Eddie Davis who was later replaced by Ralph E. Compton. Loeb had been blacklisted from television and radio several years earlier and the production was his last major role before he committed suicide on September 1, 1955.

Ziv Productions produced a 1960 television pilot, Time Out for Ginger, as part of The Comedy Shop, an anthology of prospective series. Original playwright Alexander wrote the script for the pilot, which starred Candy Moore (in her first television role) as Ginger, with Roberta Shore as older sister Joan, Maggie Hayes as Agnes, former radio star Karl Swenson as Howard, and Margaret Hamilton as the Carols' maid, the pilot was not picked up as a regular series. Candy Moore went on to play one of Lucille Ball's two young children in The Lucy Show.

Liza Minnelli played Ginger at the Bucks County Playhouse in 1964.

References

External links
 
 
 
 
 
 
 A television pilot based on the play at the Internet Archive

1952 plays
American plays adapted into films
Broadway plays